Aethes williana, the silver carrot conch, is a species of moth of the family Tortricidae. It was described by Nikolaus Joseph Brahm in 1791. It is found in most of Europe, Trans-Caspia, Asia Minor, Mongolia, north-western Africa and Iran. It is found in dry, sandy and chalky habitats.

Adults are on wing from May to early August.

The larvae feed on Daucus carota, Helichrysum arenarium, Helichrysum stoechas, Eryngium campestre, Eryngium maritimum, Gnaphalium species and Ferula communis. They bore into the lower part of the stem and the roots of their host plant, feeding from within. Larvae can be found in May and June.

References

williana
Moths of Africa
Moths of Asia
Moths of Europe
Moths described in 1791
Taxa named by Nikolaus Joseph Brahm